Good 2 Go was a female R&B/dance vocal group from Los Angeles, consisting of Melissa Miller, Natalie Fernie, Kathy Webb, Cindy Shows and Melissa Brauchler. They scored a one-hit wonder with their single "Never Satisfied", which peaked at #64 on the Billboard Pop Singles and at #10 on Billboard's R&B chart in 1992. The group released only one album, a self-titled release on Giant Records.

Good 2 Go album

Tracklist
Good 2 Go (4:14) 
Go With The Flow (3:19)
Notice Me (5:09)
Money Can't Buy Love (4:33)
White House (3:32)
Never Satisfied (4:38)
He Thinks He's All That (3:37)
Don't Want To Change You (3:20)
Romance You (5:21)
Oooooo Song (4:25)

References

External links
Never Satisfied on YouTube

Musical groups from Los Angeles
American girl groups